Mrtvica may refer to:

 Mrtvica (Vladičin Han), a village in the municipality of Vladičin Han, Serbia
 Mrtvica (Lopare), a village in the municipality of Lopare, Bosnia and Herzegovina
 Mrtvica (river), a river in Bosnia and Herzegovina along the Maganik mountains